Krasnopolov is a rural locality (a khutor) in Shakinskoye Rural Settlement, Kumylzhensky District, Volgograd Oblast, Russia. The population was 95 as of 2010. There are 2 streets.

Geography 
Krasnopolov is located in forest steppe, on Khopyorsko-Buzulukskaya Plain, on the bank of the Srednyaya Yelan River, 49 km west of Kumylzhenskaya (the district's administrative centre) by road. Kalinin is the nearest rural locality.

References 

Rural localities in Kumylzhensky District